Varhal Cheshmeh Ramezan (also Romanized as Varhāl Cheshmeh Rameẕān; also known as Cheshmeh Ramezān and Cheshmeh Rameẕān) is a village in Boli Rural District, Chavar District, Ilam County, Ilam Province, Iran. At the 2006 census, its population was 82, in 18 families. The village is populated by Kurds.

References 

Populated places in Ilam County
Kurdish settlements in Ilam Province